Dzmitry Minkou (born 31 August 1996) is a Belarusian judoka. He competed in the men's 66 kg event at the 2020 Summer Olympics in Tokyo, Japan.

He is the silver medalist of the 2021 Judo Grand Slam Kazan in the -66 kg category.

References

External links
 

1996 births
Living people
Belarusian male judoka
Judoka at the 2014 Summer Youth Olympics
Judoka at the 2019 European Games
European Games competitors for Belarus
Judoka at the 2020 Summer Olympics
Olympic judoka of Belarus
20th-century Belarusian people
21st-century Belarusian people